Cape Ellsworth is a sheer rock bluff  high forming the north end of Young Island in the Balleny Islands. It was named by personnel of the Discovery II in 1936 for American explorer Lincoln Ellsworth. The vessel, after picking up Ellsworth at Little America on the Ross Ice Shelf, made a running survey around the northern end of the Balleny Islands on the way back to Australia.

References 

Headlands of the Balleny Islands